Fappiano (May 19, 1977 – September 3, 1990) was an American Thoroughbred racehorse whose most important win was the 1981 Metropolitan Handicap. When retired to stud, he became a major sire whose offspring included Kentucky Derby winner Unbridled. He was named for Joseph C. Nichols (1905–1984), a long-time sportswriter for The New York Times, who was born Giuseppe Carmine Fappiano.

Background
Fappiano was bred and raced by U.S. Racing Hall of Fame trainer John Nerud and trained by his son, Jan. Bred in Florida, he was from one of the first crops of Mr. Prospector, then based in Florida, and helped establish Mr. Prospector's reputation as one of North America's leading sires. Fappiano was out Killaloe, an allowance race-winning daughter of Hall of Fame inductee Dr. Fager. Killaloe also produced stakes winners Torrential (FR-G1), Portroe (US-G3), Jedina and Royal Troon. Nerud had also bred Dr. Fager and Fappiano's second dam, Grand Splendor, while managing Tartan Farms. The family traces to the highly influential broodmare, Plucky Liege.

Racing career
At age two in 1979, Fappiano went undefeated in four starts. Among those wins was the Morven Stakes with future Hall of Fame jockey Angel Cordero Jr. aboard. Run on December 20, cold weather had frozen the track but in spite of the conditions Fappiano broke the Meadowlands track record for six furlongs with a time of 1:08 3/5. t. He went on to win several important races through 1980 and 1981, including the Grade I Metropolitan Handicap.

At stud
While successful in racing, Fappiano is best known as a sire and a sire of sires. At the end of 1981, he was retired and syndicated for a reported $300,000 per share. He stood at stud at Tartan Farms near Ocala, Florida, where he remained until the summer of 1987. He was then moved to Lane's End Farm in Versailles, Kentucky. Though himself a sprinter, he became known as a source of class (the ability to carry speed over distance). He was designated an Intermediate/Classic chef-de-race.

Fappiano was the grandsire of two different horses that combined to win all three U.S. Triple Crown races in the same year when Real Quiet won the 1998 Kentucky Derby and Preakness Stakes, and Victory Gallop won the 1998 Belmont Stakes. Through Unbridled, Fappiano is the great-great-grandsire of 2015 Triple Crown winner American Pharoah.

In early September 1990, Fappiano was humanely euthanized when laminitis set in while he was recovering from a fractured leg.

Fappiano notably sired:
 Tasso (b. 1983) – won 1985 Breeders' Cup Juvenile, voted American Champion Two-Year-Old Colt;
 Cryptoclearance (b. 1984) – multiple stakes winner with career earnings of US$3,376,327, sired Victory Gallop, Volponi;
 Tappiano (b. 1984) – won Spinaway Stakes, Demoiselle Stakes, Matron Stakes, career earnings of US$1,305,522;
 Quiet American (b. 1986) – won NYRA Mile Handicap, sire of Real Quiet;
 Some Romance (b. 1986) – won Frizette Stakes, Matron Stakes;
 Defensive Play (b. 1987) – won Sandown Classic Trial and Rose of Lancaster Stakes in U.K. and Man o' War Stakes, Strub Stakes in U.S., career earnings of US$1,695,557;
 Grand Canyon (b. 1987) – won Hollywood Futurity, Norfolk Stakes, career earnings of $1,019,540;
 Rubiano (b. 1987) – multiple stakes winner with career earnings US$1,203,457, voted American Champion Sprint Horse in 1992;
 Unbridled (b. 1987) – won 1990 Kentucky Derby and Breeders' Cup Classic, voted American Champion Three-Year-Old Male Horse, career earnings of US$4,489,475. sire of Empire Maker, Grindstone, Halfbridled, and Unbridled's Song;
 Cahill Road (b. 1988) – won Wood Memorial Stakes.

Pedigree

References

External links
 Fappiano's pedigree and partial racing stats
 The Australian Blood Horse Review – October, 1998 article by pedigree specialist Rommy Faversham

1977 racehorse births
1990 racehorse deaths
Racehorses bred in Florida
Racehorses trained in the United States
Horse racing track record setters
Thoroughbred family 16-a
Chefs-de-Race